Avengers of the Reef is a 1973 Australian children's film directed by Chris McCullugh and starring Simon Drake.

Plot
Scientist Bill Stewart goes to Fiji with his son Tim to investigate the appearance of the crown-of-thorns starfish in the reefs off the island. It transpires that a mining syndicate set up by Updike is deliberately seeding the reefs with the starfish to enable them to mine the reef area. Updike hires an assassin, Kemp, to kill Stewart. He fails, but Tim thinks he has succeeded and runs away to an island village pursued by Kemp. Tim makes friends with a Fijian boy, Sai, and is eventually reunited with his father.

Cast
Simon Drake as Tim Stewart
Biu Rarawa as Sai
Tim Elliot as Kemp
Noel Ferrier as Updike
Garry McDonald as Updike's aide
Dibs Mather as Bill Stewart
Lesie as Chieftain
Judy Morris as airline hostess
Jenny Lee
Richard Lupino
Bob Lee
Eddie Osborne

Production
The film was jointly financed by the actor-producer Noel Ferrier and the Australian Film Development Corporation. Shooting began in Fiji in September 1972, mainly on the island of Taveuni. Filming was delayed by several weeks because of a major cyclone.

Awards
Anne Brooksbank won an Australian Writers Guild Award for her screenplay.

References

External links

Avengers of the Reef at Oz Movies

1973 films
Australian children's films
Films shot in Fiji
Films set in Fiji
1970s English-language films
1970s Australian films